The Second Dikshit cabinet was the Council of Ministers in third Delhi Legislative Assembly headed by Chief Minister Sheila Dikshit.

Council members
 Ashok Kumar Walia
 Haroon Yusuf
 Arvinder Singh Lovely
 Yoganand Shastri
 Raj Kumar Chauhan
 Mangat Ram Singhal

References

Cabinets established in 2003
2003 establishments in Delhi
Delhi cabinets
Indian National Congress state ministries
2008 disestablishments in India
Cabinets disestablished in 2008